Sampark Kranti Express trains are a series of Superfast express trains operated by the Indian Railways providing quick connectivity to the national capital, New Delhi.

Overview 
The words Sampark and Kranti are borrowed from Sanskrit.  Sampark(Devanagari:-सम्पर्क) means Contact and Kranti(Devanagari:-क्रान्ति ) means Revolution.  The combined name denotes the steps taken by Indian Railways to provide high speed train connections from cities around India with the National Capital through the provision of non-air conditioned express trains with few stops and operating at high speeds.  A similar capability had been introduced earlier on the Rajdhani express. However, these trains were completely air-conditioned and hence quite expensive.

The Rajdhani and Shatabdi series are the fastest trains in India in terms of average journey speeds.  The Sampark Kranti trains operate at slower average speeds than the Rajdhani and Shatabdi series yet still provide high speed options at normal prices due to their few stops and relatively faster speeds compared with other non-Rajdhani Express express trains and non-Shatabdi Express express trains although initially they ran non stop once they left their respective states.

The Railway Minister (India) at the time Nitish Kumar in the interim Railway Budget of 2004-05 announced the launch of Sampark Kranti Express. The trains in the Sampark Kranti series connect the Indian states to the national capital city of New Delhi. Sampark Kranti trains charge the same fare as regular/superfast trains on the Indian Railways rail network and do not provide any special facilities not available in regular Express trains. The initial decision of non-stop run of this Express series of trains was cut short and was given way to commercial stopping outside the states. The trains aim at reducing travel time without compromising on passenger comfort.

Initially eighteen trains were launched and the count was later increased. The Karnataka Sampark Kranti Express from Delhi Hazrat Nizamuddin to Yesvantpur was the first train which was launched on 8 February 2004.
Uttar Pradesh Sampark Kranti Express link from Khajuraho got terminated with the introduction of Gita Jayanti Express and extension of the same to Khajuraho in Madhya Pradesh.

List of services

See also
 Express trains in India
 High-speed rail in India
 Rajdhani Express
 Shatabdi Express
 Duronto Express

References

External links

 List of Sampark Kranti Expresses on India Rail Info website
 Announcement in the Interim Budget
 Description in the Economic Times
 Travel article about the Uttar Sampark Kranti Express and the Jammu Tawi - Udhampur section